A layer cake (US English) or sandwich cake (UK English) is a cake consisting of multiple stacked sheets of cake, held together by frosting or another type of filling, such as jam or other preserves.  Most cake recipes can be adapted for layer cakes; butter cakes and sponge cakes are common choices. Frequently, the cake is covered with icing, but sometimes, the sides are left undecorated, so that the filling and the number of layers are visible.

Popular flavor combinations include German chocolate cake, red velvet cake, Black Forest cake, and carrot cake with cream cheese icing. Many wedding cakes are decorated layer cakes.

In the mid-19th century, modern cakes were first described in English. Maria Parloa's Appledore Cook Book, published in Boston in 1872, contained one of the first layer cake recipes. Another early recipe for layer cake was published in Cassell's New Universal Cookery Book, published in London in 1894.

Older forms

These layers are then covered with a thin layer of cream and/or jam and stacked. This stack, which is the same height as the typical Western layer cake, is then frosted so that the structure is not visible. At first glance, these cakes look much like a German konditorei style cake such as the Black Forest cake.

An example for a European layer cake invented in 1735 is the Frankfurter Kranz (Frankfurt Crown Cake) which consists of two or three layers of sponge cake filled with jam and buttercream frosted with more buttercream.

The French term gâteau when used for a cake in France and the UK means a layer cake. although the term is also used for some types of pastry-based desserts like the Gâteau Basque.

Comparison
Layer cakes typically serve multiple people, so they are larger than cupcakes, petits fours, or other individual pastries.  A common layer cake size, which is baked in nine-inch round cake pans, typically serves about 16 people.

Unlike the Vietnamese Bánh da lợn or Swiss rolls, layer cake is assembled from several separate pieces of cake.  A sheet cake can become a layer cake if it is cut into pieces and reassembled with frosting or other filling to form layers.

See also
Baumkuchen
List of cakes
Mille-feuille
Sarawak layer cake
Spekkoek
Stack cake
Torte
Mille crêpes

References